Albatron Technology Co. Ltd. is a Taiwan-based company, primarily known for being a major manufacturer of graphics cards and motherboards based on NVIDIA chipsets in the 2000s that were marketed under the brand Albatron.

History
The company began in 1984 as Chun Yun Electronics, TVs and markets. It was renamed "Albatron Technology" in 2002 and expanded its range of products. The company started making generic "noname" branded technology hardware, and started to brand its products after the name change to Albatron.

The company once had a small market share in consumer computer hardware aftermarket, but now only manufactures peripherals and accessories for consumers as their graphics cards and motherboards manufacturing is now aimed at industrial users only.

Location
The company's headquarters are located in New Taipei, Taiwan since 2002. The trading company has more than 60 distributors worldwide, and 4% of its revenues were invested in research and development.

See also
Elitegroup Computer Systems (ECS)
Gigabyte Technology
Micro-Star International (MSI)
 Asrock

References

External links

Manufacturing companies established in 1986
Graphics hardware companies
Motherboard companies
Electronics companies of Taiwan
Taiwanese brands
Manufacturing companies based in New Taipei
Taiwanese companies established in 1984